The Italian national water polo team represents Italy in men's international water polo competitions and is controlled by Federnuoto (the Italian Aquatics Federation). The national men's team has the nickname of "Settebello", a reference to both the Italian card game scopa and a standard water polo team having seven players.

The Italian men's water polo team has won 8 Olympic medals, 7 World Championships, 5 World Cup, 11 European Championships medals and 3 World League medals, making them one of the most successful men's water polo teams in the world. They have won a combined twelve championships in those five competitions, with the World League, the last competition which Italy won in 2022.

History

Water Polo became popular in Italy soon after 1899, when an exhibition match was played at the Bath of Diana in Milan, with the match being described in the press as: "like football but more tiring and difficult, requiring energy and strength beyond the ordinary".

Although a domestic league was soon established, the Italian national water polo team did not first compete at the Olympic Games until the 1920 Olympics, in Antwerp, Belgium, where they were forced to forfeit their first round match, before losing 5–1 to Greece and being eliminated.

The national team first fulfilled their potential at the 1948 Summer Olympics in London, England, when they went undefeated for the whole tournament to claim their first gold medal in the discipline.

The Italian team reclaimed the title of Olympic champions in front of a home crowd at the 1960 Olympics in Rome, Italy. Italy won their third Olympic title at the 1992 Summer Olympics in Barcelona, Spain, beating the hosts and tournament favourites Spain 9–8 after extra time in a thrilling final. Only Hungary (9), and Great Britain (4) have more Olympic titles.

The Italian national side have also won four World Championships, in 1978, 1994, 2011 and 2019, and the World Cup once in 1993. Italy also claimed their first European Championship in 1947.

Competitive record

Results

Olympic Games

World Championship

1973 – 4th place
1975 –  Bronze medal
1978 –  Gold medal
1982 – 9th place
1986 –  Silver medal
1991 – 6th place
1994 –  Gold medal
1998 – 5th place
2001 – 4th place
2003 –  Silver medal
2005 – 8th place
2007 – 5th place
2009 – 11th place
2011 –  Gold medal
2013 – 4th place
2015 – 4th place
2017 – 6th place
2019 –  Gold medal
2022 –  Silver medal

FINA World Cup

 1979 – 6th place
 1983 –  Bronze medal
 1985 – 5th place
 1987 – 5th place
 1989 –  Silver medal
 1993 –  Gold medal
 1995 –  Silver medal
 1997 – 5th place
 1999 –  Silver medal
 2002 – 4th place
 2006 – 5th place
 2023 – Qualified

FINA World League

 2002 – Semi-final round
 2003 –  Silver medal
 2004 – 4th place
 2005 – Semi-final round
 2006 – Preliminary round
 2007 – Preliminary round
 2008 – 7th place
 2009 – 5th place
 2010 – Preliminary round
 2011 –  Silver medal
 2012 –  Bronze medal
 2013 – Preliminary round
 2014 – Preliminary round
 2015 – 7th place
 2016 – 4th place
 2017 –  Silver medal
 2018 – Did not participate
 2019 – Preliminary round
 2020 – 4th place
 2022 –  Gold medal

European Championship

1927 – 12th place
1934 – 10th place
1938 – 5th place
1947 –  Gold medal
1950 – 4th place
1954 –  Bronze medal
1958 – 4th place
1962 – 8th place
1966 – 4th place
1970 – 4th place
1974 – 5th place
1977 –  Bronze medal
1981 – 6th place
1983 – 7th place
1985 – 4th place
1987 –  Bronze medal
1989 –  Bronze medal
1991 – 4th place
1993 –  Gold medal
1995 –  Gold medal
1997 – 6th place
1999 –  Bronze medal
2001 –  Silver medal
2003 – 9th place
2006 – 5th place
2008 – 5th place
2010 –  Silver medal
2012 – 4th place
2014 –  Bronze medal
2016 – 6th place
2018 – 4th place
2020 – 6th place
2022 – 4th place

Europa Cup
 2018 –  Bronze medal

Mediterranean Games

1951 – Unknown
1955 –  Gold medal
1959 –  Silver medal
1963 –  Gold medal
1967 –  Silver medal
1971 –  Silver medal
1975 –  Gold medal
1979 –  Silver medal
1983 –  Bronze medal
1987 –  Gold medal
1991 –  Gold medal
1993 –  Gold medal
1997 – 4th place
2001 –  Silver medal
2005 –  Silver medal
2009 –  Bronze medal
2013 – 4th place
2018 – 5th place
2022 – Qualified

Current squad
Roster for the 2020 Summer Olympics.

See also
 Italy men's Olympic water polo team records and statistics
 Italy women's national water polo team
 List of Olympic champions in men's water polo
 List of men's Olympic water polo tournament records and statistics
 List of world champions in men's water polo

References

External links

 
Men's national water polo teams